Labeobarbus fimbriatus is a species of ray-finned fish in the  family Cyprinidae. It is endemic to the Sanaga River system in Cameroon.

References

Endemic fauna of Cameroon
fimbriatus
Fish described in 1926